The following is a list of units of the Canadian Army as of 2022

Royal Canadian Armoured Corps

Regular Force 

 Royal Canadian Dragoons
 Lord Strathcona's Horse (Royal Canadians) 
 12e Régiment blindé du Canada

Reserve Force (Primary Reserve) 

 The Governor General's Horse Guards 
 The Halifax Rifles (RCAC) 
 8th Canadian Hussars (Princess Louise's) 
 The Ontario Regiment (RCAC) 
 The Queen's York Rangers (1st American Regiment) (RCAC) 
 Sherbrooke Hussars
 12e Régiment blindé du Canada (Militia)
 1st Hussars 
 The Prince Edward Island Regiment (RCAC) 
 The Royal Canadian Hussars (Montreal)
 The British Columbia Regiment (Duke of Connaught's Own)
 The South Alberta Light Horse 
 The Saskatchewan Dragoons 
 The King's Own Calgary Regiment (RCAC) 
 The British Columbia Dragoons 
 The Fort Garry Horse 
 Le Régiment de Hull (RCAC) 
 The Windsor Regiment (RCAC)

Royal Canadian Infantry Corps

Regular Force 

Note: each regular force regiment retains a parachute company.

 The Royal Canadian Regiment
  1st Battalion   (mechanized infantry)
  2nd Battalion   (mechanized infantry)
 3rd Battalion   (light infantry)
 Princess Patricia's Canadian Light Infantry
  1st Battalion   (mechanized infantry)
  2nd Battalion   (mechanized infantry)
  3rd Battalion   (light infantry)
 Royal 22e Régiment
  1st Battalion   (mechanized infantry)
  2nd Battalion   (mechanized infantry)
  3rd Battalion   (light infantry)

Reserve Force (Primary Reserve) 

 Governor General's Foot Guards
 The Canadian Grenadier Guards
 The Queen's Own Rifles of Canada
 The Black Watch (Royal Highland Regiment) of Canada
 Les Voltigeurs de Québec
 The Royal Regiment of Canada
 The Royal Hamilton Light Infantry (Wentworth Regiment)
 The Princess of Wales' Own Regiment
 The Hastings and Prince Edward Regiment
 The Lincoln and Welland Regiment
 The Royal Canadian Regiment
 4th Battalion
 The Royal Highland Fusiliers of Canada
 The Grey and Simcoe Foresters
 The Lorne Scots (Peel, Dufferin and Halton Regiment)
 The Brockville Rifles
 Stormont, Dundas and Glengarry Highlanders
 Les Fusiliers du St-Laurent
 Le Régiment de la Chaudière
 Royal 22e Régiment
 4th Battalion, Royal 22e Régiment (Châteauguay)
 6th Battalion
 Les Fusiliers Mont-Royal
 The Princess Louise Fusiliers
 The Royal New Brunswick Regiment
 The West Nova Scotia Regiment
 The Nova Scotia Highlanders
 The North Shore (New Brunswick) Regiment
 Le Régiment de Maisonneuve
 The Cameron Highlanders of Ottawa (Duke of Edinburgh's Own)
 The Royal Winnipeg Rifles
 The Essex and Kent Scottish
 48th Highlanders of Canada
 Le Régiment du Saguenay
 The Cape Breton Highlanders
 The Algonquin Regiment (Northern Pioneers)
 The Argyll and Sutherland Highlanders of Canada (Princess Louise's)
 The Lake Superior Scottish Regiment
 The North Saskatchewan Regiment
 The Royal Regina Rifles
 The Rocky Mountain Rangers
 The Loyal Edmonton Regiment (4th Battalion, Princess Patricia's Canadian Light Infantry)
 The Queen's Own Cameron Highlanders of Canada
 The Royal Westminster Regiment
 The Calgary Highlanders
 Les Fusiliers de Sherbrooke
 The Seaforth Highlanders of Canada
 The Canadian Scottish Regiment (Princess Mary's)
 The Royal Montreal Regiment
 Irish Regiment of Canada
 The Toronto Scottish Regiment (Queen Elizabeth the Queen Mother's Own)
 The Royal Newfoundland Regiment
 1st Battalion
 2nd Battalion

Royal Canadian Engineers

Regular Force 

 1 Combat Engineer Regiment
 2 Combat Engineer Regiment
 4 Engineer Support Regiment
 5 Combat Engineer Regiment

Reserve Force (Primary Reserve) 

 Regiments
 31 Combat Engineer Regiment
 32 Combat Engineer Regiment 
 33 Combat Engineer Regiment 
 34 Combat Engineer Regiment 
 35 Combat Engineer Regiment 
 36 Combat Engineer Regiment
 37 Combat Engineer Regiment
 39 Combat Engineer Regiment
 41 Combat Engineer Regiment

Royal Canadian Artillery

Regular Force 

  1st Regiment, Royal Canadian Horse Artillery
  2nd Regiment, Royal Canadian Horse Artillery
 5e Régiment d'artillerie légère du Canada
 4th Artillery Regiment (General Support), RCA

Reserve Force (Primary Reserve) 

 Regiments
 1st (Halifax-Dartmouth) Field Artillery Regiment, RCA
 2nd Field Artillery Regiment, RCA
 3rd Field Artillery Regiment, RCA
 5th (British Columbia) Field Artillery Regiment, RCA
 6th Field Artillery Regiment, RCA
 7th Toronto Regiment, RCA
 10th Field Regiment, RCA
 11th Field Regiment, RCA
 15th Field Regiment, RCA
 20th Field Artillery Regiment, RCA
 26th Field Artillery Regiment, RCA
 30th Field Artillery Regiment, RCA
 42nd Field Artillery Regiment (Lanark and Renfrew Scottish), RCA
 49th Field Artillery Regiment, RCA
 56th Field Artillery Regiment, RCA
 62nd Field Artillery Regiment, RCA

 Independent batteries
 20th Independent Field Battery, RCA
 84th Independent Field Battery, RCA
 116th Independent Field Battery, RCA

Corps of Royal Canadian Electrical and Mechanical Engineers

Regular Force 

 1 Service Battalion
 2 Service Battalion
 5 Service Battalion

Reserve Force 

 31 Service Battalion, London, Windsor, Hamilton, Ontario
 32 Service Battalion, Toronto
 33 Service Battalion, North Bay, Ottawa, Sault Ste. Marie
 34 Service Battalion, Montreal, Saint-Hubert
 35 Service Battalion, Quebec City
 36 Service Battalion, Halifax, Sydney
 37 Service Battalion, Saint John, St. John's
 38 Service Battalion, Saskatchewan, Winnipeg, Thunder Bay
 39 Service Battalion, Victoria, Vancouver
 41 Service Battalion, Calgary, Edmonton

Royal Canadian Corps of Signals

Regular Force 

Canadian Forces School of Communications and Electronics, Kingston
Canadian Forces Joint Signal Regiment
1 Canadian Mechanized Brigade Group Headquarters & Signal Squadron, Edmonton
2 Canadian Mechanized Brigade Group Headquarters & Signal Squadron, Petawawa
5 Canadian Mechanized Brigade Group Headquarters & Signal Squadron

Reserve Force 

31 Signal Regiment (31 Canadian Brigade Group)
32 Signal Regiment (32 Canadian Brigade Group)
33 Signal Regiment (33 Canadian Brigade Group)
34 Signal Regiment (34 Canadian Brigade Group)
35 Signal Regiment (35 Canadian Brigade Group)
36 Signal Regiment (36 Canadian Brigade Group)
37 Signal Regiment (37 Canadian Brigade Group)
38 Signal Regiment (38 Canadian Brigade Group)
39 Signal Regiment (39 Canadian Brigade Group)
41 Signal Regiment (41 Canadian Brigade Group)

Intelligence Branch

Regular Force 

 Canadian Army Intelligence Regiment (CA Int Regt), Kingston, Edmonton, Petawawa, Ottawa and Valcartier

Reserve Force (Primary Reserve) 

 2 Intelligence Company, Toronto
 3 Intelligence Company, Halifax
 4 Intelligence Company, Montreal
 6 Intelligence Company, Edmonton
 7 Intelligence Company, Ottawa

See also 

 Canadian Army
 Canadian Militia
 Canadian units of the War of 1812
 List of regiments of cavalry of the Canadian Militia (1900–1920)

Notes

External links
 Canadian Army Bases and Units

 01
Army
Units